The chapters of the manga series Chibi Vampire were written and illustrated Yuna Kagesaki. The series premiered in Japan as Karin in Monthly Dragon Age in 2003 where it ran till its conclusion in 2008. The 58 individual chapters were collected and published in fourteen tankōbon by Kadokawa Shoten between October 2003 and April 2008. The chapters follow the growing romance between Karin, a mixed-up vampire who gives blood instead of taking it, and Kenta, a classmate who learns her secret and becomes her daytime help.

A series of light novels, which cover the same timeline as the manga, are being written by Tohru Kai with Kagesaki. Chibi Vampire: The Novel series is closely tied to the manga releases, with each volume designed to be read after the corresponding manga volume. For example, the first novel takes place between the events that occur in the first and second volumes of the manga series. Chibi Vampire also uses characters introduced in and refers to events that occur within the novel series. As of April 2008, nine volumes have been released in the light novel series in Japan. The manga was also adapted into a twenty-four episode anime series produced by J.C.Staff. The anime series aired in Japan on WOWOW from November 3, 2005 through May 11, 2006.

The series is licensed for English-language release in North America by Tokyopop, which renamed the series from Karin to Chibi Vampire To avoid confusion with another of its properties. It released the first volume in April 2006; the final volume was released in September 2009. 


Volume list

References

Chibi Vampire